Sweet Mother Texas is an album by American country music artist Waylon Jennings, released on RCA Records in 1986.

Featuring a scant eight songs, this would be Jennings' last album for the label before his move to MCA.  Released with little promotion, it contains outtakes from Jennings' recent albums, such as a cover of Bruce Springsteen's "I'm on Fire" and a version of Kris Kristofferson's "Living Legend", which would be recorded by The Highwaymen in 1990, on Highwayman 2.  "Looking for Suzanne" had been previously released on Waylon's Greatest Hits, Vol. 2.  Sweet Mother Texas failed to chart, marking an unceremonious end of Jennings' twenty-year stay at RCA. The title track was previously recorded by Eddy Raven on his 1980 album Eyes.

Track listing
"I'm on Fire" (Bruce Springsteen) – 2:35
"Me and Them Brothers of Mine" (Tommy L. Jennings) - 3:06
"I Take My Comfort in You" (Wayland Holyfield, Guy Clark) - 3:28
"Looking for Suzanne" (Paul Kennerley) - 3:39
"Be Careful Who You Love (Arthur's Song)" (Harlan Howard) – 4:33
With Johnny Cash 
"Sweet Mother Texas" (Sanger D. Shafer, Eddy Raven) - 2:53
"Living Legend" (Kris Kristofferson) - 4:45
"Hanging On" (Tony Joe White) - 3:51

Production
Producer: Jerry Bridges, Gary Scruggs, Ritchie Albright, Waylon Jennings
Art Direction: Bill Barnes
Cover Photography: Bill Mitchell

Personnel
Pickers: Waylon Jennings, Ralph Mooney, Jerry Bridges, Gary Scruggs, Jim Haber, Dan Mustoe, Tony Joe White, Earl Scruggs, Randy Scruggs, Ritchie Albright, Sonny Curtis, Harrison Calloway, Gordon Payne
Singers: Waylon Jennings, Johnny Cash, Patti Leatherwood, Carter Robertson, Barny Robertson

References

Waylon Jennings albums
1986 albums
RCA Records albums